Narathiwat Airport  is an airport in Narathiwat Province, Thailand.

Serving the Narathiwat Province, the airport is strategically important for the region's infrastructure both geographically and economically as it serves as both a joint domestic and Thai military outpost airport.

Currently there are only direct flights from the Narathiwat Airport to Bangkok which operate on a daily and bi-daily basis, however recent planning by the Department of Airports suggests the terminal will undergo major upgrades which is resulting in the planning of additional routes to and from Narathiwat from both domestic and international airlines.

Airlines and destinations

References

External links

  Narathiwat Airport Homepage
 skyvector.com

Buildings and structures in Narathiwat province
Airports in Thailand
Airports established in 1974